Chastity is a 1923 American silent drama film directed by Victor Schertzinger and starring Katherine MacDonald, J. Gunnis Davis, and Huntley Gordon.

Plot
As described in a film magazine review, unsuccessful at first on the stage, Norma O'Neill finally wins Broadway recognition. Gossip links her name with that of Fergus Arlington, who had backed her. Darcy Roche, in love with Norma, is jealous of Fergus and reproaches Norma. Norma decides to leave the stage. She is reported as having been killed in an automobile accident, but the body is that of her understudy, mistaken for her. Later Darcy meets Norma in California, and she explains that Fergus was her guardian. The lovers are reunited.

Cast
 Katherine MacDonald as Norma O'Neill 
 J. Gunnis Davis as Nat Mason 
 J. Gordon Russell as Sam Wolfe 
 Huntley Gordon as Darcy Roche 
 Frederick Truesdell as Fergus Arlington 
 Edythe Chapman as Mrs. Harris
 Verne Winter

References

Bibliography
 James Robert Parish and Michael R. Pitts. Film directors: a guide to their American films. Scarecrow Press, 1974.

External links
 

1923 films
1923 drama films
1920s English-language films
American silent feature films
Silent American drama films
Films directed by Victor Schertzinger
American black-and-white films
First National Pictures films
Preferred Pictures films
1920s American films